Steven D. "Steve" Hofbauer is an American politician and former senior Fire Inspector from California. Hofbauer is the mayor of Palmdale, California.

Education  
Hofbauer attended Pierce College, Los Angeles Valley College, UCLA Extension, California State University, Los Angeles, and other colleges.

Career 
Since 1980, Hofbauer started his paramedic career with Los Angeles Fire Department. Hofbauer is a former senior Fire Inspector, licensed EMT and paramedic. He served multiple tours of duty as a Medical Team Leader with the L.A. County Disaster Medical Assistance Team. He received highly specialized training as a member of the elite National Medical Response Team, a unit of the US Public Health Service, trained to treat victims of industrial, nuclear or chemical accidents, or terrorist acts involving Weapons of Mass Destruction.

In 1990, he became a Palmdale Planning Commissioner. In 2003, Hofbauer became a member of the city council for Palmdale, California. On November 6, 2018, he was elected mayor of Palmdale, defeating Jim Ledford and V. Jesse Smith with 44.3% of the votes. A Republican, he was sworn in as mayor on December 11, 2018.

Awards 
 1994 Los Angeles Community Protector award.
 2018 Certificate of Valor. Presented by Los Angeles County Fire Department.

Personal life 
Hofbauer and his wife, Barbara,  have two children. Hofbauer and his family live in Palmdale.

In July 2022, Hofbauer was hospitalized at Cedars-Sinai Medical Center in Los Angeles Thursday to undergo tests for an auto-immune disorder, after spending two days at Antelope Valley Hospital.

References

External links 
 Full Biography for Steven "Steve" Hofbauer
 Steve Hofbauer at ballotpedia.org
 stevehofbauer.net
 Steven D. Hofbauer

California city council members
Living people
Mayors of places in California
Paramedics
People from Palmdale, California
Year of birth missing (living people)